Sundown is a 1924 American silent Western film directed by Laurence Trimble and Harry O. Hoyt, produced and distributed by First National Pictures, and starring Bessie Love. Frances Marion, Marion Fairfax, and Kenneth B. Clarke wrote the screenplay based on an original screen story by Earl Hudson. This film was the only production cinematographer David Thompson ever worked on. This film is presumed lost.

Production 
It was primarily filmed on location in Texas, on a plateau  outside of El Paso.

Plot 
In the American West, tensions between ranchers and homesteaders rise as homesteads take over land that ranchers need for their cattle. John Brent (Stewart) and his son Hugh (Bosworth) decide to drive their cattle to Mexico and settle there. Their cattle stampede, destroying the home of the Crawleys. Young Ellen Crawley (Love) convinces the Brents to let her family accompany them to Mexico. Hugh and Ellen fall in love.

Cast

Reception 
The film was universally well-reviewed.

References

External links

 
 
 
 
 Still featuring Bessie Love
 Lobby card

1924 films
1924 Western (genre) films
1924 lost films
American black-and-white films
Films directed by Harry O. Hoyt
Films directed by Laurence Trimble
First National Pictures films
Lost American films
Lost Western (genre) films
Silent American Western (genre) films
1920s American films
1920s English-language films